The Edward J. Bloustein School of Planning and Public Policy of Rutgers University (The Bloustein School) serves as a center for the theory and practice of urban planning, public policy and public health/health administration scholarship. The school is located in New Brunswick, New Jersey, and was named in honor of the former Rutgers University president, Edward J. Bloustein (1971 to 1989). Through its academic programs and research centers, the Bloustein School engages in instruction and research, and combines learning and application (for example, it holds "studios" in which students practice engaged scholarship by working with community stakeholders on urban planning and policy issues in communities throughout the United States).  The school's strengths and the specializations of its faculty are vast and many of its faculty members are the founders of theories or practices that are now commonplace in urban planning and policy. Areas of expertise for Bloustein faculty members include transportation planning and the environment, urban and community health, workforce development, and social justice. 

The school offers undergraduate degree programs in health administration, planning and public policy, public health, public policy, and urban planning and design; master's programs in urban planning, public policy, health administration, public informatics; and a Ph.D program in urban planning and policy development. Joint and dual degree master's programs in law, business administration, infrastructure planning, food and business economics, and public health are also offered. The school does not currently offer any degrees online.

The school's planning programs are accredited by the Planning Accreditation Board and its policy programs are accredited by the Network of Schools of Public Policy, Affairs, and Administration.

History 
The Bloustein School has its origins in the political science department of the Rutgers New Brunswick campus.  In 1956, the department offered a professionally oriented master of arts degree in political science with a focus on politics and public policy. The curriculum was significantly reformed between 1978–1980 with an emphasis on public policy analytics and quantitative methods for policy research.  A capstone practicum course was also added. From 1980 to 1992, the program of study under the MA professional concentration in politics and public policy remained essentially unchanged.

The Department of Urban Planning and Policy Development was created in 1967.  Early faculty members recollect that department's mission was forged in the tempestuous cauldron of the late 1960s’ urban unrest and the desire to address, through research and service, the inequalities underlying it. The PhD degree in urban planning was inaugurated at Rutgers in 1968, and the first doctoral degrees were awarded within three years of the program's founding in 1971. In 1978, the name of the doctoral program was changed to the PhD in Urban Planning and Policy Development, reflecting the programmatic emphasis on policy and politics that has characterized urban planning at Rutgers since its inception. Beginning in the late eighties, the program began review and accreditation which it has since repeated five times in 1992, 1997, 2003, 2008 and 2014.  It has been awarded with the highest accolades by the American Institute of Certified Planners and the Association of Collegiate Schools of Planning.

The founding of the Bloustein School and the Public Policy program occurred in 1992 and was named after Edward J. Bloustein, the seventeenth president of Rutgers, The State University of New Jersey. During the 1992–1993 academic year, Department of Public Policy faculty developed and received approval for the establishment of a two-year master of public policy degree at the Bloustein School. This new degree program added additional courses in policy analysis, quantitative methods, economics, and a summer field internship between the first and second year of full-time study.  To meet the needs of students who already had several years of professional experience working in government and nonprofit institutions, public policy faculty also created a 30-credit (one-year) master of public affairs and politics that would replace a similar program previously taught at the Eagleton Institute of Politics.  Along with the master of public policy degree, the Department of Urban Planning and Policy Development became one of the master's programs taught at the school. From 1995 until the present, the school has been based out of the Civic Square Building in downtown New Brunswick.  The Civic Square Building puts students in the heart of their community adjacent to government administrators and services.  Its location is also centrally located among the three Rutgers campuses in New Brunswick and at the center of the downtown economy.

The undergraduate major in Health Administration was created in 2015.  In January 2017, the Bloustein School enrolled its first cohort of graduate students in the executive master of health administration program. The two-year, cohort-based program is designed for the health professional with five or more years of experience in the field. The traditional master of health program began enrolling students in the fall of 2017, and is designed for students who have completed a bachelor's degree, have less than five years of experience in the healthcare industry, or are seeking to make a career change and complete the program at their own pace on a full- or part-time basis. The two tracks seek to prepare students for leadership and management positions in governmental, nonprofit, public and private organizations. In the first year of course offerings, more than 100 students applied to the two programs, with an initial enrollment of 80 students. Both programs are designated to achieve accreditation by the Commission on Accreditation of Healthcare Management Education (CAHME) by 2020.

The master of public informatics program was created in 2019 to provide a vehicle for educating students in the competencies needed in the field of big data: context, statistics, programming, data management, data analytics, visualization, spatial analysis, applications and the integration of these skills. The school's curriculum has always required intensive study of data analysis and multivariate methods, and as students mastered these skills, more challenging applications of data analysis and interpretation have been added. Applications of the program include all of the school's major areas of study, including the realms of transportation, environmental management, urban design, mobility, social policy, public management and operations, public health, health administration, and community engagement and empowerment. The addition of a big data program to the school's portfolio enables students to break the barriers that have existed between traditionally siloed research areas by using big data to understand complex urban and social policy issues in new ways.

Admissions and financial aid 

Admission to the Bloustein School is competitive. Prospective students are individuals who have graduated from approved institutions and who show evidence of potential for successful completion of a graduate program. Qualified students may be eligible for need- or merit-based financial aid. The Bloustein School also offers research and practicum opportunities through the wide variety of centers and institutes housed within the school.

The Bloustein School is a veteran-friendly institution with both faculty and staff who are themselves veterans of the Armed Forces. Rutgers is also a member of the Yellow Ribbon Program which assists veterans by making additional funds available to cover the cost of education without an additional charge GI Bill entitlements.  In 2019 Rutgers ranked third in the Military Times list of Best Schools for Military Students. It was also the largest university in the top ten rankings.

In July 2019, The American Public Transportation Foundation announced that Bloustein School Ph.D. candidate Sicheng Wang as the recipient of a 2019 scholarship. Mr. Wang was also the recipient of the scholarship in 2018.  This award marked the ninth straight year at least one Bloustein student was awarded one of their scholarships; overall, 12 Bloustein students received scholarships during that time.

Academics

Degree programs 

The Bloustein School educates a select pool of students, preparing them for both public and private sector careers, teaching and research professions, and service at all levels of government.  Undergraduate students admitted to the Bloustein School enter one of five undergraduate majors, but are allowed to pursue joint degrees (double majors). Undergraduate degrees are available in:
BS-Health Administration
BA-Planning and Policy
BS-Public Health
BS-Public Policy
BS-Urban Planning and Design

Undergraduate students who take a specified selection of courses may earn a minor in any of the programs above.  Two additional minors available to undergraduate students include:
Public Administration
Urban Studies

Graduate Students admitted to the Bloustein School are accepted into one of four six degrees or a Doctor of Philosophy (PhD) in Planning and Public Policy.  PhD's are conferred through the Graduate School-New Brunswick as it is an advanced scholarly degree appropriate for students seeking a career in university teaching and research or a leadership position in planning and public policy in the public, private or non-profit sector.  The majority of graduate students are enrolled in one of three graduate programs: the masters in public policy, the masters of city and regional planning, and the masters of health administration. The full list of graduate degrees includes:
 Master of Public Policy
 Master of City and Regional Planning
 Master of Health Administration
 Master of Public Informatics
 Master of Public Affairs and Politics
 Master of City and Regional Studies
 Executive Master of Health Administration
 Doctor of Philosophy (PhD) in Planning and Public Policy

Concentrations and transdisciplinary learning 

Graduate concentrations at the Bloustein School vary by degree but may include GIS, community development, energy policy, international development, health policy, or transportation planning. Additional courses outside the Bloustein School that may appeal to students are offered within the university in the Departments of Landscape Architecture; Agricultural, Food, and Resource Economics; Ecology, Evolution, and Natural Resources; Environmental Sciences; and Geography.

Bloustein Students may also take a limited number of courses at Princeton University and New Jersey Institute of Technology as the school has reciprocal arrangements with both schools.

Rankings and outcomes 

In 2018, the public health program was ranked the #1 program for veterans interested in studying public health.

In 2019, Planetizen ranked the Bloustein school 3rd in its 6th Edition of the Planetizen Guide to Graduate Urban Planning Programs - behind only MIT and the University of California, Berkeley.

Bloustein students have earned many awards and recognitions at national competitions.

Engaged Scholarship 

The Bloustein School has had a Bloustein Honors Research Program for undergraduate students since the 2019-2020 academic year. The honors program is a formal, supervised year-long (6 credits – 3 in fall, 3 in spring) project that involves both a peer classroom learning environment and research with an individual Bloustein faculty mentor. Students meet weekly as a class to learn and practice general research and paper writing skills from the course instructor that will provide a common structure to the overall honors experience. They submit weekly assignments that guide them through understanding research and planning and completing their research project. Each student has a Bloustein faculty member who specializes in the student's topic areas as their primary advisor (mentor).

Student organizations 

Walk Bloustein Bike Bloustein (WBBB) is a graduate student interest group whose goal is to provide an opportunity for students to learn more about bicycle and pedestrian planning and advocate for improved biking and walking facilities on the Rutgers University campus.

Facilities 
Since 1995 the Bloustein School has been located in the Civic Square Building in downtown New Brunswick.  The school boasts two computer laboratories that together house 75 computer work stations for students to run software for geoprocessioning, statistics, big data analysis, and graphic design.  The school has also invested over $350,000 in renovations  which added an additional 25 work stations and created five "smart classrooms."  The school also provides its students with professional printing software and products in order to reduce the cost of research poster and design competitions.  The Civic Square Building is open to students twenty-four hours a day and year-round.

Research and impact 
Top revenue generators are in the fields of transportation planning, workforce development, public health, labor policy, and risk/environment/energy policy.

Research Centers 
The school is host to several research centers and collaborative programs, established by the University's Board of Governors. These specialized centers carry out large-scale projects and are supported by external funding. Many of these centers offer continuing education and training programs for government officials, nonprofit leaders, and career professionals.

There are currently more than a dozen research centers split between the Civic Square Building and the John J. Heldrich Center for Workforce Development across the street.

Notable EJB alumni 

 Staci Berger
 Athony Townsend
 Richard Florida
 Robert Cotter
 Aaron Fichtner
 Jeffrey Gutman
 Shams Eldien Naga
 Robert Nardi
 Bruce Graham
 Paul J. Wiedefeld
 Susan Gruel
 David Listokin
 Jesse Keyes

Notable current and former EJB faculty 

 James J. Florio
 Kelcie Ralph
 Frank Felder
 Robert Lake
 David Listokin
 Jane Miller
 Frank Popper
 Michael Smart
 Michael Greenberg
 Robert Noland
 Jocelyn Crowley
 Robert Noland
Stuart Shapiro
Nancy Wolff
Carl Van Horn
Joel Cantor

Deans of the Bloustein School

See also
Center for Urban Policy Research
National Transit Institute
Rutgers Journal of Law & Public Policy

References

External links
Edward J. Bloustein School of Planning and Public Policy official website

Public policy schools
Rutgers University colleges and schools
Universities and colleges in Middlesex County, New Jersey
Buildings and structures in New Brunswick, New Jersey